Trans–Siberian or Transsiberian may refer to:
Trans–Siberian Railway, a railway line from Moscow to Vladivostok
Rossija (train), a passenger train service from Moscow to Vladivostok commonly called the Trans-Siberian
Trans–Siberian Railway (Fabergé egg), a jewelled Easter egg
Trans-Siberian Orchestra, an American rock band
Transsiberian (film), a 2008 thriller film, directed by Brad Anderson, set on the Trans–Siberian Railway and its Trans–Manchurian branch, which runs from China to Moscow.